The 17th parallel south is a circle of latitude that is 17 degrees south of the Earth's equatorial plane. It crosses the Atlantic Ocean, Africa, the Indian Ocean, Australasia, the Pacific Ocean and South America.

Around the world
Starting at the Prime Meridian and heading eastwards, the parallel 17° south passes through:

{| class="wikitable plainrowheaders"
! scope="col" width="125" | Co-ordinates
! scope="col" | Country, territory or ocean
! scope="col" | Notes
|-
| style="background:#b0e0e6;" | 
! scope="row" style="background:#b0e0e6;" | Atlantic Ocean
| style="background:#b0e0e6;" |
|-
| 
! scope="row" | 
|
|-
| 
! scope="row" | 
|
|-
| 
! scope="row" | 
|
|-
| 
! scope="row" | 
| The border with Zimbabwe is in Lake Kariba
|-
| 
! scope="row" | 
|
|-
| 
! scope="row" | 
|
|-
| 
! scope="row" | 
|
|-
| 
! scope="row" | 
|
|-valign="top"
| style="background:#b0e0e6;" | 
! scope="row" style="background:#b0e0e6;" | Indian Ocean
| style="background:#b0e0e6;" | Mozambique Channel - passing just north of Juan de Nova Island, 
|-
| 
! scope="row" | 
|
|-
| style="background:#b0e0e6;" | 
! scope="row" style="background:#b0e0e6;" | Indian Ocean
| style="background:#b0e0e6;" |
|-
| 
! scope="row" | 
| Île Sainte-Marie
|-
| style="background:#b0e0e6;" | 
! scope="row" style="background:#b0e0e6;" | Indian Ocean
| style="background:#b0e0e6;" | Passing just south of Coco Island, 
|-
| 
! scope="row" | 
| Western Australia
|-
| style="background:#b0e0e6;" | 
! scope="row" style="background:#b0e0e6;" | Indian Ocean
| style="background:#b0e0e6;" | King Sound
|-valign="top"
| 
! scope="row" | 
| Western Australia Northern Territory Queensland - mainland and Wellesley Islands
|-
| style="background:#b0e0e6;" | 
! scope="row" style="background:#b0e0e6;" | Indian Ocean
| style="background:#b0e0e6;" | Gulf of Carpentaria
|-
| 
! scope="row" | 
| Queensland - Horseshoe Island
|-
| style="background:#b0e0e6;" | 
! scope="row" style="background:#b0e0e6;" | Indian Ocean
| style="background:#b0e0e6;" | Gulf of Carpentaria
|-
| 
! scope="row" | 
| Queensland - Bentnick Island
|-
| style="background:#b0e0e6;" | 
! scope="row" style="background:#b0e0e6;" | Indian Ocean
| style="background:#b0e0e6;" | Gulf of Carpentaria
|-
| 
! scope="row" | 
| Queensland
|-valign="top"
| style="background:#b0e0e6;" | 
! scope="row" style="background:#b0e0e6;" | Pacific Ocean
| style="background:#b0e0e6;" | Passing through the Coral Sea Islands Territory, 
|-
| 
! scope="row" | 
| Island of Tongariki
|-
| style="background:#b0e0e6;" | 
! scope="row" style="background:#b0e0e6;" | Pacific Ocean
| style="background:#b0e0e6;" |
|-
| 
! scope="row" | 
| Yasawa Islands
|-
| style="background:#b0e0e6;" | 
! scope="row" style="background:#b0e0e6;" | Pacific Ocean
| style="background:#b0e0e6;" | Bligh Water
|-
| 
! scope="row" | 
| Vanua Levu island
|-
| style="background:#b0e0e6;" | 
! scope="row" style="background:#b0e0e6;" | Pacific Ocean
| style="background:#b0e0e6;" | Koro Sea
|-
| 
! scope="row" | 
| Taveuni island
|-valign="top"
| style="background:#b0e0e6;" | 
! scope="row" style="background:#b0e0e6;" | Pacific Ocean
| style="background:#b0e0e6;" | Passing just north of the Lau Islands,  Passing just south of Maupihaa atoll,  Passing just south of Raiatea island,  Passing just south of Huahine island, 
|-
| 
! scope="row" | 
| Tetiaroa atoll
|-valign="top"
| style="background:#b0e0e6;" | 
! scope="row" style="background:#b0e0e6;" | Pacific Ocean
| style="background:#b0e0e6;" | Passing just south of Tahanea atoll,  Passing just north of Motutunga atoll,  Passing just south of Tepoto atoll, 
|-valign="top"
| 
! scope="row" | 
| Marutea atoll
|-valign="top"
| style="background:#b0e0e6;" | 
! scope="row" style="background:#b0e0e6;" | Pacific Ocean
| style="background:#b0e0e6;" | Passing just south of Rekareka atoll, 
|-
| 
! scope="row" | 
|
|-
| 
! scope="row" | 
|
|-valign="top"
| 
! scope="row" | 
| Mato Grosso Goiás - passing just south of Goiânia Minas Gerais Bahia
|-
| style="background:#b0e0e6;" | 
! scope="row" style="background:#b0e0e6;" | Atlantic Ocean
| style="background:#b0e0e6;" |
|-
|}

See also
17th parallel north
16th parallel south
18th parallel south

s17